The Roman Catholic church of St. Mary Magdalene in Lviv, Ukraine, is located west of the city's Old Town, by the Lviv Polytechnic.

The church was built at the beginning of the 17th century for the Dominican Order, combining the styles of Renaissance and Baroque, and consecrated in 1630. The church and monastery were plundered and burned in 1704 by Swedes, only to be rebuilt by 1758 with an extended nave and new Baroque facade with two towers decorated with pilasters and cornices and rococo sculptures of Saint Dominic and Saint Hyacinth. These sculptures are situated between the pediment and the tower, which were added to the preserved polygonal apse including an altarpiece presenting scenes from the life of Saint Mary Magdalene in stucco.

After the suppression of the Dominican monastery by the Austrian emperor Joseph II in 1783, its building was used a prison and the church was transferred to the diocese. The church underwent subsequent minor changes, with the groundwork carried out in front of it in 1880 necessitating the addition of stairs and a balcony; in 1889 Neo-Baroque tower-helmets were installed along with a clock on the southern tower.

In 1923 the monastery building was given to the Lviv Polytechnic, and in 1927 conservation work was carried out in the complex which continued until the outbreak of World War II. This work included the installation of an organ produced by the Czech Brothers Rieger workshop.

Under Soviet rule the church remained open longer than most others in Lviv, operating until it was closed in 1962. Most of the interior was plundered or destroyed after this, including the side altars, sculptures, and ambo, with only the organ and altar surviving today. In 1969 the church building was assigned to the Lviv Philharmony, which established an organ concert hall in it.

The parish was officially re-established in 1991 with the collapse of the Soviet Union. However, the church has not yet been returned, and at the moment remains the property of the state from which the faithful have to rent it to attend the Holy Mass.

Churches in Lviv